Humberto Cota (born February 7, 1979) is a Mexican former professional baseball catcher. He played with the Pittsburgh Pirates of Major League Baseball (MLB).

Career
Cota was signed as an amateur free agent by the Atlanta Braves on December 22, . He was released in January  without having played any games. In May 1997, he signed with the Tampa Bay Devil Rays. After two years in the lower levels of their minor league system, Cota was traded with Joe Oliver to the Pittsburgh Pirates for José Guillén and Jeff Sparks on July 23, .

He continued to advance through Pittsburgh's minor league system before making his MLB debut on September 9, . On April 7, 2003, he caught a perfect game with batterymate John Wasdin of the Nashville Sounds. He became a free agent after the  season.

He signed a minor league contract with the Washington Nationals before the  season, but refused an assignment to minor league camp during spring training and became a free agent. He then signed a minor league deal with the Colorado Rockies.

On May 28, 2008, Cota was suspended 50 games for failing a drug test. He became a free agent at the end of the season and signed a minor league contract with an invitation to spring training with the Cincinnati Reds on February 2, . He was released in March 2009.

From the 2008 to 2009 winter through that of 2016 to 2017, Cota played in the Mexican League and the Mexican Pacific Winter League. He briefly played for the Arizona Diamondbacks' Double-A Mobile BayBears in 2013. On May 24, 2016, he was traded to the Mexican League's Broncos de Reynosa, and then to the Vaqueros Laguna on June 28. On September 19, he was returned to the Bronco. He was released on March 18, 2017..

References

External links

1979 births
Living people
Águilas de Mexicali players
Altoona Curve players
Baseball players from Sonora
Baseball players suspended for drug offenses
Charleston RiverDogs players
Colorado Springs Sky Sox players
Gulf Coast Devil Rays players
Hickory Crawdads players
Hudson Valley Renegades players
Indianapolis Indians players
Major League Baseball players from Mexico
Major League Baseball catchers
Mexican expatriate baseball players in the United States
Mexican League baseball first basemen
Mexican League baseball catchers
Mobile BayBears players
Nashville Sounds players
Naranjeros de Hermosillo players
Pittsburgh Pirates players
Princeton Devil Rays players
Sultanes de Monterrey players
Tomateros de Culiacán players
2013 World Baseball Classic players
Sportspeople from San Luis Río Colorado